James A. Drake is an American academic administrator. In March 2007, he was named president of Brevard Community College (Eastern Florida State College), a public college with campuses in Palm Bay, Melbourne, Cocoa, and Titusville, Florida. With average annual enrollments of averaging nearly 30,000 students, the multi-campus institution is one of the 100 largest community colleges in the U.S. Prior to his appointment at Brevard, Drake served as associate vice president for academic affairs and director of the University of Central Florida's Southern Region campuses, through a partnership with Brevard Community College.

Early life 
He was born in Columbus, Ohio in 1944. While completing his doctoral studies, he accepted an offer to join the faculty of Ithaca College (Ithaca, NY). Drake earned a Ph.D. degree from Ohio State University in 1973. He worked for eight years as a tenured professor and academic administrator. He served as chair of the Department of Education, associate director of graduate studies, and director of televised studies. In the latter role, he worked with PBS station WNET/13 in New York City for the distribution of credit-earning television courses for teachers in New York State and New Jersey. 

Drake served as an academic administrator at the University of Tampa (1979–84), Findlay College (1984–1987), and Clemson University (as executive director of the University Center, Greenville, South Carolina, 1988–1994). In 1987–88 he served as a full-time research consultant and equity partner with an Ohio-based management consulting firm, co-directing the higher-education division.

Drake is the author of seven books and more than fifty commercial and academic articles. Two of his biographies, Ponselle: A Singer’s, and Richard Tucker: A Biography, with forewords by tenor Luciano Pavarotti, were selected as “Books of the Month” by National Book Clubs of America. Fifteen years after Ponselle: A Singer's Life was published, Drake returned to her in Rosa Ponselle: A Centenary Biography (Amadeus Press), in which he employed a postmodern format to present and analyze conflicting accounts of Rosa Ponselle's life and career. His other books include Teaching Critical Thinking (1976), a textbook stemming from his doctoral research; Popular Culture and American Life (with M. W. Laforse, 1980); and Lily Pons: A Centennial Portrait (with K. B. Ludecke and a foreword by Beverly Sills, 1999).

Drake was a contributing author to American National Biography, as well as to The International Dictionary of Opera. He served on the editorial board of The Opera Quarterly, a vocal-music journal. His expertise in 19th and 20th century operatic performances led him to co-host the radio series Voices That Live, originating from the CBS Radio affiliate in Ithaca, N.Y.

Personal life 
Drake and his wife live in Merritt Island, Florida.

References

Heads of universities and colleges in the United States
Classical music radio presenters
1944 births
Living people
People from Columbus, Ohio
Ohio State University alumni
People from Merritt Island, Florida